Robert Almer (born 20 March 1984) is an Austrian former professional footballer who played as a goalkeeper.

Club career
After starting in the Austrian amateur leagues with SC Untersiebenbrunn and DSV Leoben, Almer was signed by FK Austria Wien and assigned to the club's reserve squad. In 2006, he joined SV Mattersburg and gained regular first team appearances for the team in the Austrian Bundesliga. He resigned for Austria Wien two years later as back-up for first choice goalkeeper Szabolcs Sáfár. During his first season back in Vienna, Almer was selected in goal for the 2009 Austrian Cup Final, winning his first major trophy.

Almer went on to play for Fortuna Düsseldorf and FC Energie Cottbus in the German 2. Bundesliga, before joining first division Hannover 96, where he failed to make a first team appearance. In 2015, he signed for Austria Wien for the third time, becoming the club's first choice goalkeeper and captain.

International career
Almer debuted for the Austria national football team in a 2–1 loss to Ukraine on 15 November 2011. He was selected as first-choice goalkeeper for UEFA Euro 2016 and kept Austria's first clean sheet at a major tournament in 32 years during the 0–0 group stage draw with Portugal on 18 June 2016.

References

External links
 
 
 
 Robert Almer Injury - news on derstandard.at (German)

1984 births
Living people
Austrian footballers
Austria international footballers
Austrian expatriate sportspeople in Germany
Association football goalkeepers
SC Untersiebenbrunn players
DSV Leoben players
Fortuna Düsseldorf II players
Fortuna Düsseldorf players
FC Energie Cottbus players
SV Mattersburg players
FK Austria Wien players
Hannover 96 players
Austrian Football Bundesliga players
Bundesliga players
2. Bundesliga players
Expatriate footballers in Germany
UEFA Euro 2016 players
People from Bruck an der Mur
Footballers from Styria